Jan Przecherka (18 February 1922 – 7 January 1981) was a Polish footballer. He played in four matches for the Poland national football team in 1948.

References

External links
 

1922 births
1981 deaths
Polish footballers
Poland international footballers
Place of birth missing
Association footballers not categorized by position